Nordic combined at the 2011 European Youth Winter Olympic Festival was held from 13 to 17 February 2011. It was held at the Ski Jumping Venue Ještěd and the Cross Country Venue Vesec at Liberec, Czech Republic.

Results

Medal table

Events

References 

Nordic combined
2011 in Nordic combined
2011